Patrick Lewis Studstill Jr. (June 4, 1938 – October 16, 2021) was an American professional footballer who was a wide receiver, punter and return specialist. He played 12 years in the National Football League (NFL) for the Detroit Lions (1961–1967), Los Angeles Rams (1968–1971), and New England Patriots (1972). He led the NFL with 457 punt return yards in 1962. In 1966, he led the league in both receiving yards (1,266) and punting yards (3,259). He also tied an NFL record in 1966 with a 99-yard touchdown reception.

Early years
Studstill was born in 1938 in Shreveport, Louisiana. He attended C. E. Byrd High School in Shreveport where he was a star athlete in both track and football. He graduated from Byrd High in 1957 and attended the University of Houston on a football scholarship. He sustained a leg injury as a senior and only played 10 minutes that year.

Professional football

Detroit Lions
Studstill was undrafted in the 1961 NFL Draft. He signed with the Detroit Lions in August 1961. As a rookie, he appeared in all 14 games, principally returning punts and kickoffs. On October 8, 1961, in a victory over the Chicago Bears, he returned a kickoff 100 yards for the Lions. He ranked fourth in the NFL with an average of 28 yards per kickoff return.

In 1962, he led the NFL with 457 yards on 29 punt returns, an average of 15.8 yards per return. He was also the Lions' No. 2 receiver in 1962 with 36 catches for 479 yards and four touchdowns.

Standstill injured his left knee during the Lions' first contact drill in the summer of 1963. He underwent surgery and missed the 1963 season.

In 1965, Studstill appeared in all 14 games for the Lions, including 12 games as a starter at the flanker position. He led the team with 28 receptions and three receiving touchdowns and ranked second on the team with 389 receiving yards. He also added punting to his responsibilities and was the leading punter in the NFL by the middle of October. He finished the 1965 season ranked sixth in the NFL in punting, having kicked 78 times for an average of 42.8 yards per punt. He was chosen for the Pro Bowl at the end of the 1965 season.

Studstill's best year was 1966, when he was second in the NFL with 67 receptions and led the league with 1,266 receiving yards. One of his five touchdowns went for 99 yards, making him the third player to accomplish this feat. Since then, eight other players have tied his record. In 1966, he had five consecutive games with 125+ pass receiving yards, which had since been tied by Calvin Johnson. At the end of the 1966 season, Studstill was selected as a first-team All Pro by the Sporting News, Associated Press, UPI, and Football Weekly.

In 1967, Studstill missed seven games with a pulled hamstring muscle.

Los Angeles Rams
In May 1968, Studstill was traded to the Los Angeles Rams as part of a multi-player deal that sent Bill Munson to the Lions. Studstill spent four years with the Rams, appearing in 56 games, but only one as a starter. He caught 28 passes for the Rams and scored three touchdowns, but he was used primarily as a punter. He averaged 41.4 yards per punt in 1971.

While playing for the Rams, he wore a maskless helmet while punting, making him one of the last players in the NFL to play without a facemask.

New England Patriots
Studstill was placed on waivers by the Rams prior to the 1972 season. He was claimed by the New England Patriots. He was used exclusively as a punter during the 1972 season.

Studstill sustained a knee injury during training camp in May 1973. Studstill claimed the injury required surgery, and the Patriots disputed the injury and refused to honor his contract for the 1973 season.

For his career, Studstill punted 560 times for 22,764 yards, an average of 40.7 yards per punt.

Family and later years
Studstill was married in July 1960 to Barbara Jean Pickard. Both were students at the University of Houston. With Barbara, he had a son, Pat Studstill III, and daughter, Lisa.  He later remarried to his second wife, Rita Vennari. 

After retiring as a player, he was hired as a technical advisor on the 1974 prison football film, The Longest Yard. He also worked as an actor in television shows, movies, and more than 300 commercials. Between 1981 and 1985, he had a recurring role as Barclay on The Dukes of Hazzard. Other credits included Magnum, P.I., The Incredible Hulk, and Paper Lion.

In 1999, Studstill was inducted into the Louisiana Sports Hall of Fame.

He died on October 16, 2021 at his home in Los Angeles.

References

1938 births
2021 deaths
Actors from Shreveport, Louisiana
American football punters
American football wide receivers
Houston Cougars football players
Detroit Lions players
Los Angeles Rams players
New England Patriots players
Players of American football from Shreveport, Louisiana
Western Conference Pro Bowl players